The 1973 Lamar Cardinals football team represented Lamar University as a member of the Southland Conference during the 1973 NCAA Division II football season. Led by 11th-year head coach Vernon Glass, the Cardinals compiled an overall record of 5–5 with a mark of 3–2 in conference play, tying for second place in the Southland. Lamar played home games at Cardinal Stadium in Beaumont, Texas.

Schedule

References

Lamar
Lamar Cardinals football seasons
Lamar Cardinals football